Norman Cliff (born September 1, 1930) is an American psychologist. He received his Ph.D. from Princeton in psychometrics in 1957. After research positions in the US Public Health Service and at Educational Testing Service he joined the University of Southern California in 1962. He has had a number of research interests, including quantification of cognitive processes, scaling and measurement theory, computer-interactive psychological measurement, multivariate statistics, and ordinal methods. One of his major contributions to psychometrics was the method for rotation of canonical components. Asserting that much of psychological data have only ordinal justification, Cliff also published various papers and a book on ordinal methods for research. On the one hand this included extensions to the established ordinal methods for correlating data (i.e. Kendall's tau, Spearman's rank correlation coefficient). However, on the other hand, Cliff also suggested that there are viable and robust ordinal alternatives to mean comparisons. He introduced a measure of proportional difference (or dominance) between two sets of data often referred to as Cliff's delta. He has been president of the Psychometric Society and of the Society for Multivariate Experimental Psychology. Now an Emeritus Professor, he lives in New Mexico.

References
 Cliff, N. (1966). Orthogonal Rotation to Congruence. Psychometrika, 31 (1), pp. 33–42.
 Cliff, N., & Krus, D. J. (1976). Interpretation of canonical analysis: Rotated vs. unrotated solutions. Psychometrika, 41, 35–42.(Request reprint).
 Cliff, N. (1987). Analyzing Multivariate Data. San Diego, CA: Harcourt Brace Jovanovich.
 Cliff, N. (1993). Dominance statistics: Ordinal analyses to answer ordinal questions. Psychological Bulletin, 114, 494–509.
 Cliff, N. (1996). Ordinal Methods for Behavioral Data Analysis. Mahwah, NJ: Lawrence Erlbaum. 
 Cliff, N. (1996). Answering ordinal questions with ordinal data using ordinal statistics. Multivariate Behavioral Research, 31, 331–350.
 Long, J. D., Feng, D., & Cliff, N., (2003). Ordinal analysis of behavioral data. In J. Schinka & W. F. Velicer (Eds.), Research Methods in Psychology. Volume 2 of Handbook of Psychology (I. B. Weiner, Editor-in-Chief).  New York: John Wiley & Sons. 

21st-century American psychologists
Living people
1930 births
Wayne State University alumni
Princeton University alumni
Psychometrika editors
20th-century American psychologists